Fox and His Friends (also known as Fist-Right of Freedom) is a 1975 West German drama film written and directed by Rainer Werner Fassbinder, starring Fassbinder, Peter Chatel and Karlheinz Böhm. The plot follows the misadventures of a working-class gay man who wins the lottery, then falls in love with the elegant son of an industrialist. His lover tries to mold him into a gilt-edged mirror of upper-class values, and ultimately swindles the easily flattered "Fox" out of his fortune. The film is an incisive look at the relationship between money and emotions. Love is seen as a commodity that can be bought for money and lasts only as long as it is profitable.

Plot

Franz Bieberkopf is a sweet and unsophisticated working-class gay man who works in a carnival as "Fox, the Talking Head". He finds himself without a job when his boyfriend Klaus, the carnival owner, is arrested for tax fraud. Fox visits his sister Hedwig who likes to drink and is in no mood or situation to provide any help. After losing the remaining money that he possessed, Fox turns to tricks in order to buy the lottery ticket he is convinced will bring him his fortune. Cruising in a public restroom, Fox meets an older man, Max, a sophisticated antique art dealer, who is not willing to give Fox the small amount of money he needs. Undeterred, Fox stops at a flower shop and swindles the ten marks he needs from an overweight gay florist. With that money, Fox buys a lottery ticket as the newsagent is closing.

A month later, Fox is at a party where Max introduces him to his cultured gay friends. One of them, the handsome but hypocritical Eugen, shuns Fox for his proletarian manners, but quickly changes his mind when he learns that Fox has won 500,000 German marks in the lottery. The unscrupulous Eugen immediately leaves his boyfriend, Philip, and, with no effort, entices Fox who he finds easy prey. They spend the night at Eugen's apartment, starting a relationship. The next morning, Philip finds them together, but Eugen convinces Philip to step aside for some time. Later, Fox and Eugen go to a working-class gay bar and then to an up-market restaurant, where they meet Eugen's two other friends. Eugen then takes Fox round his new factory. Later, Fox goes to a gay spa and talks to Max, who suggests investing in Eugen's company. Fox then takes out 100,000 marks and gives them to Eugen; they go to the factory to tell Eugen's father.

Eugen gets evicted from his apartment for moral reasons (two men living together); he suggests that Fox buy his own apartment. They visit one and Fox buys it, then buys furniture from Max for 80,000 marks. They go clothes-shopping at Eugen's ex-boyfriend's, Philip's shop, and again Fox pays for it all. Later, they have lunch at Eugen's parents' home and Fox has no table manners. He then signs a contract for the 100,000-Mark loan, which he barely understands. (Eugen's attorney, realizing that Fox is barely literate, gives him only a cursory, patronizing explanation of the contract before he signs.) Fox and Eugen go to the gay bar, and find that Klaus has been released from prison; Fox lends him 30,000 marks, and Eugen is jealous. At the apartment, they throw a party, during which Philip whispers to Max that he might be living there later; the party ends abruptly when Hedwig, drunk, makes a fuss. To iron out their disagreements, they decide to go on holiday. At the travel agent's office, Eugen decides on Marrakech, Morocco; Fox pays for it again. In Morocco, they pick up a local male prostitute (El Hedi ben Salem), and go to a restaurant with him; he is not let into the hotel because he is an Moroccan. The hotel assistant says, however, that they have male escorts specially for the hotel.

Back from the holiday, the couple learn the company is bankrupt; the workers cannot be paid. Fox suggests giving his flat to Eugen, so the bank lets him take a loan to pay them. Eugen goes to the opera with Max, leaving Fox alone; Fox goes to the gay bar, throws a fit, gives 500 marks to the florist and runs off. The next day at the factory, Fox makes a mistake with some imprints; Eugen's father tells him off. Later, they all have dinner together and again, Fox has no table manners or savoir-faire. Fox goes to a pub and propositions two American soldiers, but nothing happens, they just leave. He drives to the gay bar, the florist hits on him and Fox slaps him; Fox has a panic attack. Back at the flat, he tells Eugen about the attack but his lover doesn't seem to care. The next day, he goes to a doctor, who gives him sedative pills.

Fox breaks up with Eugen, who says he is taking the apartment to make up for the bungled imprints. (Although the printing error cost the business 150,000 marks, Fox does not realize that it was covered by Eugen's insurance, ironically purchased with Fox's loan.) At the factory the next day, he is told that the 100,000 marks from the contract was paid back in his monthly salary, he didn't have to work. Later he goes to the apartment and he is not let in; Eugen has resumed his relationship with Philip. Fox then goes to his sister's, they have an argument and he goes to sleep in his car. The next day he sells his new car (a De Tomaso Pantera) for only 8,000 marks. Later in the gay bar, Fox sees the American soldiers and they ask him how much he pays; he starts sobbing as the florist tries to console him.

The next day Fox lies dead on the floor in the underground; he has killed himself with the pills. Two very young schoolboys steal his money and golden watch from him. Max and Klaus see him; they leave when they see he is dead, as they do not want to be involved in his death. The boys, who had hidden when Klaus and Max arrived, emerge and resume looting Fox's body.

Cast

Events at screenings

At the first showing in France, on 27 January 1978 at the Festival du film homosexuel, twenty far-right militants interrupted the screening. They stole the proceeds and caused six injuries.

See also

 List of lesbian, gay, bisexual, or transgender-related films by storyline

Notes

References

Bibliography

External links
 
 
 Fox and His Friends: Social Animals – an essay by Michael Koresky at The Criterion Collection

1975 films
1975 drama films
1975 LGBT-related films
1970s German-language films
Films directed by Rainer Werner Fassbinder
Films set in Munich
Films shot in Munich
Gay-related films
German drama films
German LGBT-related films
LGBT-related drama films
West German films
1970s German films